Lahsavareh (also Romanized as Lahsavāreh; also known as Lahvāreh) is a village in Sadat Mahmudi Rural District, Pataveh District, Dana County, Kohgiluyeh and Boyer-Ahmad Province, Iran. At the 2006 census, its population was 95, in 19 families.

References 

Populated places in Dana County